Yerenis Yisel De León Batista (born 23 February 1995) is a Panamanian footballer who plays as a defender for Spanish club CD Pozoalbense and the Panama women's national team.

See also
 List of Panama women's international footballers

References

External links

1995 births
Living people
Panamanian women's footballers
Women's association football defenders
Panama women's international footballers
Panamanian expatriate women's footballers
Panamanian expatriate sportspeople in Ecuador
Expatriate women's footballers in Ecuador